Clementina is a tragic play by the Irish writer Hugh Kelly. It was first staged at Covent Garden Theatre in February 1771. The plot follows a young Italian woman Clementina's marriage to Rinaldo despite her father's opposition to the wedding as he had wished her to marry Palermo. It ends with Palmero killing Rinaldo, and Clementina committing suicide in her despair.

In the History of Drama Allardyce Nicoll describes it as "a poor dull pseudo-classic production, in spite of its Italian scene". The original cast included Mary Ann Yates as Clementina, Robert Bensley as Granville and Richard Wroughton as Palermo.

References

Bibliography
 Nicoll, Allardyce. A History of English Drama 1660-1900. Volume III: Late Eighteenth Century Drama. Cambridge University Press, 1952.

Plays by Hugh Kelly (poet)
1771 plays
Tragedy plays
West End plays